Zestusa is a genus of skippers in the family Hesperiidae subfamily Eudaminae. Species of the genus occur in Mexico and the western United States.

Species
The following species are recognised in the genus Zestusa:
 Zestusa dorus (W. H. Edwards, 1882)
 Zestusa elwesi (Godman & Salvin, 1893)
 Zestusa staudingeri (Mabille, 1888)
 Zestusa levona Steinhauser, 1972

References

Natural History Museum Lepidoptera genus database

External links
Funet Taxonomy, distribution

Hesperiidae
Hesperiidae genera
Taxa named by Arthur Ward Lindsey